Bath Local School District is a public school system located in Bath Township near Lima, Ohio. The district also includes part of Monroe Township. It is the only school district in Bath Township. They are a member of the Western Buckeye League (entered 1965).

The school district consists of 3 buildings, the Elementary School, the Middle School also known as the Junior High, and Bath High School. A new Elementary building was built and opened for students in December 2014.  The schools have received a rating of "Excellent School" by the Ohio Department of Education during school years '01–'02, '02–'03, '03–'04, '04–'05, '05–'06, '06–'07, and '07–'08. 75% of students continue their education immediately after graduation. With the availability of surrounding colleges such as OSU Lima and Rhodes State College, Bath students have an opportunity to participate in the post-secondary options program which is sponsored by the Ford Motor Company. Many students also take classes offered at the Apollo Career Center, which is a joint vocational school in the area.

Mascot
The school mascot is the Wildcat for boys' sports and the Wildkitten for girls' sports. The girls’ soccer teams’ mascot is the LadyCats. The school colors are Columbia Blue and Gold.

Organizations
School organizations at Bath include: Band, Symphonic Band, Choir, FCA, Interact Club, National Honor Society, Quiz bowl, Science fair, Mathcounts, The Paw Print Newspaper, Science Olympiad, Student council, and Yearbook editors.

Recognition
U.S. News & World Report awarded Bath High School a bronze award for their America's Best High Schools 2009 rankings.  They were the only high school in Allen County to be recognized.

Athletics

Ohio High School Athletic Association State Championships

 Girls Basketball – 1987
 Girls Softball – 2001, 2014
 Boys Golf - 2005

Western Buckeye League Championships
Baseball: 1990, 1975, 1974, 1972, 1971
Boys Basketball: 1971, 1970, 1969
Girls Basketball: 2021, 2009, 2008, 2006, 2001, 2000, 1999, 1998, 1996, 1994, 1987, 1986, 1985, 1983
American football: 1999, 1996, 1989, 1988, 1985, 1984, 1974, 1973
Golf: 2006, 2005, 2004, 1995, 1978, 1976, 1974, 1973, 1972, 1970, 1969, 1968, 1967, 1966
Softball: 2005, 2002, 2001, 1999, 1998, 1997, 1996, 1995, 1994, 1993, 1992, 1990, 1985, 1983
Boys Tennis: 1983, 1982
Boys Track: 1990, 1980, 1968
Volleyball: 1996, 1995, 1994, 1993, 1992, 1988

Boys Soccer 2012

Supporters

Boosters
Since its inception, the Bath Booster Club has helped raise money to support the many different athletic programs at Bath High School. Most recently the club has provided funds to build new soccer and softball fields for the Bath student athletes.

Music Association
The Mission of the Bath Music Association is to provide unified educational and financial support for the students of the Bath Bands, Bath Choirs, and their directors. They are a volunteer, non-profit organization to aid financially or in any way whatsoever according to need and available funds the Band Program and Choir Program of Bath schools.

Parent Teacher Society
The PTS is a large organization of parents, teachers, and community citizens who volunteer their time and talents to help ensure their children receive a valuable, rewarding and quality education at Bath Schools. During the past school year, the Bath PTS has helped sponsor many events and groups at the elementary, middle, and high school levels. A few of those events include the Senior Breakfast, the Honors Program, the IDAA and SODDA teams, Author-Illustrator visits, Dollars for Scholars, family disaster funds and field trips for all Bath buildings. The funds to support these programs are derived from three major projects of the Bath PTS. They include: the Wildcat Den at the Allen County Fair, the Fall Craft Show held each year in November, and our Annual PTS Membership Drive.

School songs

Alma mater
Sing praises to the Blue and Gold,
Sing praises to thy fame.
May each loyal son and daughter
Bring honor to thy name.
May we always show our loyalty
As we have in days gone by.
And may our hearts be ever true
To you, Bath High.

School fight song
Fight, fight, fight, fight to win this game! 
Try, try, try, try for victory!
Fight is our motto
And fight we do!
Bath! Rah! Bath! Rah!
Show them how it's done.
And we will always be so true to you!
And we will never let you down.
For we are loyal for ever,
To Bath High School!

Administration

District-wide
Superintendent: Richard Dackin
Treasurer: Annette Morman
Director of Special Education, Testing & Federal Programs: Thomas Schaaf

High school
Principal: Brian Jesko
Assistant Principal:James Fay

Middle school
Principal: Brad Clark
Assistant Principal: Cameron Staley

Elementary school
Principal: Chris Renner
Assistant Principal: Chris Clark

Board of Education members
President: Mike Armentrout
Vice President: Rob Foley
Jackie Place
Jessica Kelley 
Phil White

References

External links

School districts in Ohio
Education in Allen County, Ohio